Baba Shivo (also known as Goran Baba, c. 13th–14th century) is a folk deity, worshiped in Jammu & Kashmir and Himachal Pradesh. He is a warrior-hero, venerated as Rudra Ansh avatar. He is referenced in the folklore of Jammu. Little historical knowledge of him  exists other than that he was son of Raja Ladh dev aka Raja Ladhha and Queen Kalavati aka Rani Kalli.

Kingdom 
Baba Shivoji 's father was King of Pattan. Pattan is one of the historical capitals of Kashmir, nearly in the centre of the valley. Pattan tehsil hosts the remains of four palaces including two within the municipal limits. Rajatarangini tells us that the king of Kashmir Shankaravarmma built a town named Pattana.

Legend
According to legend, Shivo was born with the blessings of Guru Gorakhnath, who blessed his parents Raja Ladh Dev and Rani Kalli to have a child like Lord Shiva, whose name was conferred on the child.

Early life 
King Ladh dev had no child, until he showed his kundali to his kulguru, who told him that he could have only one thing in his destiny: either the kingdom or a child. Then on the recommendation of Yogis, it was suggested that if he wanted a son then he must leave his kingdom and adopt Austerity (Tapasya) and pray to Gorakhnath for the child. After handing over the throne to his younger brother, Both king and queen left for Sauram hills and after worshipping there for years, they moved towards Samotha where they prayed to Gorakhnath for twelve years and Gorakhnath blessed them that a son will be born to them who would be the incarnation of Rudra, and he should named Shiv Dev (Shivo). After nine months, Shivo was born to them in the holy land of Samotha.

Other
When he grew up, he decided to work for the king of Jammu Raja Mal Dev in his palace. According to folklore, a lion came in the region who used to kill animals of public and Raja announced that he would give prize to a person who will kill the lion. One day when Shivo was going towards Jammu, he saw that lion and killed him with his sword, then cut off its ears and put it under a pillar of palace. Due to this, the king realised that he was a godly man and touched his feet and baba gave Spiritual gyaan to him.

Shivo used to play a musical instrument dotara. In area surrounding Samotha, in hills of Goran there lived Kharadkhatri Rajputs. When Shivo used to play Dotara, the women of Kharadkhatris used to come out of their homes to listen the music. Kharadkhatri found this playing to be an insane act and conspired to kill Shivo when he was busy in playing Dotara. They cut down head of Baba which remained there, but his body travelled to the Goran where Babaji's temple was later constructed. Most of the Kharadkhatris were killed by curse of Babaji while others left the area and changed their Gots. It is said that the Baba Goran fulfill the wishes of devotees who pray with true heart and strong determination. Many people ask for wishes to the Baba and then offer Bhandara (charity kitchen) at the temple after the wish is fulfilled. Goat sacrifice is also given there in name of baba ji. Baba Shivo (Goran Baba) is the kuldev of Sarmal Clan of the Suryavanshi Dogra Rajputs. Devotees from Hindu and Muslim communities throng the shrine mainly on Sunday and Tuesday.

Festivals
Every year, a wrestling match is held in the name of Baba Shivo at the shrine. The Baba Shivo Chhadi yatra also takes place from Samotha to Goran.

References

Indian folklore
Hindu folk deities